James Edward Pendleton (January 7, 1924  — March 20, 1996) was an American professional baseball player, an outfielder in Major League Baseball (MLB) between 1953 and 1962. He played for the Milwaukee Braves, Pittsburgh Pirates, Cincinnati Reds and Houston Colt .45s. Before appearing in MLB, he was a Negro league player.

Early life
Pendleton was born in 1924 in St. Charles, Missouri. Pendleton joined a Negro minor league team in Asheville before he was promoted to the Negro American League in 1948. Playing shortstop for the Chicago American Giants, he hit .301. The following year, he was in the American Association as an outfielder with the St. Paul Saints, an affiliate of the Brooklyn Dodgers. Upon signing with the Dodgers organization, he took two years off his age. He was the only black player in the American Association at the time of his signing. In 1951, St. Paul moved him back to shortstop. The next year, he played for the Dodgers' minor league team in Montreal.

Between 1950 and 1952, Pendleton hit between .291 and .301 each season, averaging 14 home runs and more than 15 triples per year during that period. Despite his minor league success, two factors worked against the possibility of a promotion to the Dodgers. Brooklyn already had a star major league shortstop, Pee Wee Reese, and the franchise was worried about backlash from the rest of baseball if it promoted more than one black player to the major leagues each year. The Dodgers also rejected trade offers from other teams during that time.

MLB career
With Reese holding strong as the Dodgers shortstop, Brooklyn agreed to a trade that sent Pendleton to the Milwaukee Braves as part of a four-team February 1953 transaction that involved Cincinnati and the Philadelphia Phillies, as well as the Dodgers. He made his MLB debut at 29 on April 17, 1953. On August 30 of that season, Pendleton  hit three home runs in a game against the Pittsburgh Pirates, to become just the second rookie in Major League history to hit three homers in a single game, joining his teammate Eddie Mathews, who dit it a year earlier.

Overall, Pendleton played more than 100 games in the outfield for Milwaukee and batted .299 in a part-time role, which increased his popularity. In 1957, he hit .305 in 46 games for the Pirates, but after three at bats in 1958, he was sent back to the minors for the rest of 1958 campaign.

In his MLB career, Pendleton appeared in 444 games over eight seasons, hitting 19 home runs. He died in Houston, Texas, at the age of 72.

See also
 List of Negro league baseball players who played in Major League Baseball

References

External links
 or Seamheads, or Baseball Almanac, or Baseball Library, or Retrosheet, or Venezuelan Professional Baseball League

1924 births
1996 deaths
African-American baseball players
Baseball players from Texas
Chicago American Giants players
Cincinnati Reds players
Columbus Jets players
Havana Sugar Kings players
Houston Colt .45s players
Jersey City Jerseys players
Leones del Caracas players
Major League Baseball outfielders
Milwaukee Braves players
Montreal Royals players
Navegantes del Magallanes players
American expatriate baseball players in Venezuela
Oklahoma City 89ers players
People from St. Charles, Missouri
Pittsburgh Pirates players
St. Paul Saints (AA) players
San Antonio Bullets players
Toledo Sox players
Wichita Braves players
20th-century African-American sportspeople
American expatriate baseball players in Canada
Klamath Falls Gems players
American expatriate baseball players in Cuba